Duquesne is a city along the Monongahela River in Allegheny County, Pennsylvania, United States, within the Pittsburgh metropolitan area. The population was 5,254 at the 2020 census.

History
The city of Duquesne was settled in 1789 and incorporated in 1891. The city derives its name from Fort Duquesne.

Duquesne Works, a productive steel mill that was part of Carnegie Steel Corporation and later part of U.S. Steel, was the heart and soul of Duquesne during its brightest moments in the early 20th century. Duquesne was home to the largest blast furnace in the world, named the "Dorothy Six". Bob Dylan´s song Duquesne Whistle (Tempest, 2012) is dedicated to it.

The city's population peaked in 1930, then declined with deindustrialization beginning in the 1960s. Today a stark post-industrial landscape, Duquesne has fewer total residents (5,565 at the 2010 U.S. census) than were the city's mill workers in 1948. According to the McKeesport Daily News, Duquesne has the worst performing schools in the state of Pennsylvania. Duquesne was designated a financially distressed municipality in 1991 by the state.

Geography

Demographics

As of the census of 2000, there were 7,332 people, 3,179 households, and 1,853 families residing in the city. The population density was 4,035.0 people per square mile (1,555.4/km). There were 3,768 housing units at an average density of 2,073.7 per square mile (799.4/km). The racial makeup of the city was 38.92% White, 57.75% African American, 0.15% Native American, 0.14% Asian, 0.01% Pacific Islander, 0.74% from other races, and 2.29% from two or more races. Hispanic or Latino of any race were 0.72% of the population.

There were 3,179 households, out of which 28.1% had children under the age of 18 living with them, 25.8% were married couples living together, 27.2% had a female householder with no husband present, and 41.7% were non-families. 37.2% of all households were made up of individuals, and 18.6% had someone living alone who was 65 years of age or older. The average household size was 2.28 and the average family size was 3.00.

In the city the population was spread out, with 28.3% under the age of 18, 9.6% from 18 to 24, 24.3% from 25 to 44, 18.6% from 45 to 64, and 19.2% who were 65 years of age or older. The median age was 36 years. For every 100 females, there were 80.3 males. For every 100 females age 18 and over, there were 75.1 males.

The median income for a household in the city was $19,766, and the median income for a family was $25,898. Males had a median income of $25,046 versus $22,272 for females. The per capita income for the city was $12,067. About 31.3% of families and 34.7% of the population were below the poverty line, including 52.9% of those under age 18 and 19.7% of those age 65 or over.

Government
Nickole Nesby, Duquesne’s first Black female mayor, took office in January 2018.

Education
Duquesne City School District operates a public elementary school.

Duquesne High School closed in 2007. Beginning with the 2007–08 school year, Duquesne students have reported to West Mifflin Area High School, or East Allegheny High School. Since July 2007, the Allegheny Intermediate Unit (AIU) has managed all academic and business operations of the Duquesne's K-8 school district.

Notable people
 Daniel Ford, musician
 Gene Gedman, running back for two-time NFL champion Detroit Lions
 Martha Farkas Glaser, civil rights activist and manager of Jazz musician Erroll Garner
 Earl Hines, jazz pianist
 Ed Karpowich, NFL player
 George Little, NFL player
 Dave Maurer, head football coach at Wittenberg University and College Football Hall of Fame inductee
 Frederick J. Osterling, architect
 Dave Pilipovich, basketball head coach and Air Force Academy
 Lafayette Pitts, cornerback for the Atlanta Falcons
 Alex Shigo, horticulturist
 Johnny Stevens, MLB umpire
 Donald Soffer, businessman, investor and philanthropist

References

External links
 

Cities in Allegheny County, Pennsylvania
Populated places established in 1789
Pennsylvania populated places on the Monongahela River
1789 establishments in Pennsylvania
Cities in Pennsylvania